Păuşa may refer to several villages in Romania:

 Păuşa, a village in Nojorid Commune, Bihor County
 Păuşa, a village in Românași Commune, Sălaj County
 Păuşa, a village in the town of Călimăneşti, Vâlcea County